Jacob Ulfeldt (25 June 1567–25 June 1630) was a Danish diplomat, explorer, and chancellor of King Christian IV of Denmark.

Early life and family
Jakob Ulfeldt was born at Bavelse, the son of privy councillor Jacob Ulfeldt (1535–1593) and Anne Jakobsdatter Flemming.Ulfeldt married Birgitte Brockenhuus (9 August 1580–24 December 1656) on 10 June 1599 in Nyborg. She was the daughter of lensmand Laurids Brockenhuus (1552–1604), owner of Egeskov and Bramstrup, and Karen née Skram (1544–1625). Together, Jakob and Anne had 17 children, including:

 Corfitz Ulfeldt (1606–1664)
 Elsebet Jacobsdatter (died 1676)
 Knud Ulfeldt (1600–1646)
 Eiler Ulfeldt (1613–1644)
 Frands Ulfeldt (1601–1636)
 Laurids Ulfeldt (1605–1659)
 Ebbe Ulfeldt (1610–1654)
 Flemming Ulfeldt (1607–1657).

Career
From 1581 he travelled widely, reaching many places which were rarely visited by Danish travellers at the time, and did not return to Denmark until 1597. Among the destinations he visited were Greece, Turkey, Rhodes, Cyprus, Egypt and Syria. After returning to Denmark in 1597, he managed his estates, included Ulfeldtsholm which he had inherited from his father in 1693. In 1616, he sold Ulfeldtsholm  to Ellen Marsvin and instead acquired Egeskov Castle.

In 1607, Ulfeldt became a member of the Privy Council. In 1609, he was appointed Chancellor of the Realm. He was a driving force behind the alliance with the Netherlands in 1621 and the extended union with the duchies of Schleswig-Holstein in 1623. Unlike the Privy Council, from 1621 he worked for the creation of a Protestant union under the leadership of Christian IV in the Thirty Years' War, an effort which was successful in 1625.

Writings
Ulfeldt has left a vivid account of his travels in the Holy Land and Egypt, which is still kept at the Danish Royal Library, describing Constantinople, the Colossus of Rhodes, Islands in the Adriatic Sea, Cyprus, Tripoli, Beirut, Sidon, Tyre (Lebanon), Jaffa, Jerusalem, and Cairo together with the Giza pyramids and Pyramid of Djoser.

References

1567 births
1630 deaths
17th-century Danish politicians
16th-century Danish diplomats
Danish explorers
Danish travel writers
Jacob, 1567